North Cherry Street Historic District is a national historic district located at Winston-Salem, Forsyth County, North Carolina.  The district encompasses 62 contributing buildings and 1 contributing object in a historically African-American residential section of Winston-Salem.  The buildings date from about 1925 to 1951, and include notable examples of Colonial Revival and Bungalow / American Craftsman style architecture.

It was listed on the National Register of Historic Places in 2004, with a boundary decrease in 2014.

References

African-American history in Winston-Salem, North Carolina
Houses on the National Register of Historic Places in North Carolina
Historic districts on the National Register of Historic Places in North Carolina
Colonial Revival architecture in North Carolina
Buildings and structures in Winston-Salem, North Carolina
National Register of Historic Places in Winston-Salem, North Carolina
Houses in Forsyth County, North Carolina
2004 establishments in North Carolina